Chakrit Rawanprakone (born 3 March 1991) is a Thai professional footballer who plays as a forward for Thai League 3 club Dragon Pathumwan Kanchanaburi.

Honours

Club
Muangthong United
 Thai League 1 (1): 2009

Dragon Pathumwan Kanchanaburi 
Thai League 3 Western Region (1): 2022–23

References

External links

Chakrit Rawanprakone
1991 births
Living people
Association football forwards
Chakrit Rawanprakone
Chakrit Rawanprakone
Chakrit Rawanprakone
Chakrit Rawanprakone
Chakrit Rawanprakone
Chakrit Rawanprakone
Chakrit Rawanprakone
Chakrit Rawanprakone